Blue Skies is an American drama television series created by Carol and Nigel Evan McKeand, that aired on CBS from June 13 until August 1, 1988.

Premise
A divorced ad executive moves to Oregon with his new wife and blended family to run a sawmill.

Cast
Tom Wopat as Frank Cobb
Season Hubley as Annie Pfeiffer Cobb
Kim Hauser as Zoe Pfeiffer
Alyson Croft as Sarah Cobb
Danny Gerard as Charley Cobb
Pat Hingle as Henry Cobb
Lois Foraker as Claire Ordway

Episodes

References

External links

1980s American drama television series
1988 American television series debuts
1988 American television series endings
English-language television shows
CBS original programming
Television series by CBS Studios
Television shows set in Oregon